Illinois Route 32 (IL 32) is a north–south highway with its southern terminus at U.S. Route 40 and Illinois Route 33 in Effingham and its northern terminus at Illinois Route 48 at Cisco, a few hundred feet south of Interstate 72.

Route description 
Illinois 32 overlaps Illinois 33 from Shumway to Effingham, where Illinois 32 terminates and Illinois 33 continues east through Effingham to the Vincennes, Indiana area. Traveling north, Illinois 32 services Windsor, Sullivan, Lovington, and Cerro Gordo before reaching Cisco.

History 
SBI Route 32 was established in 1918 from the Decatur area (actually Cerro Gordo) to Windsor. In 1937 it was extended to Effingham,  and in January 1998, it was extended north to Illinois 48.

Major intersections

References

External links 

 Illinois Highway Ends: Illinois Route 32

032
Transportation in Effingham County, Illinois
Transportation in Shelby County, Illinois
Transportation in Moultrie County, Illinois
Transportation in Piatt County, Illinois
Transportation in Macon County, Illinois